Saint-Aubin is a village and commune in the Jura department in the Bourgogne-Franche-Comté region in eastern France.

It is the birthplace of the noted singer Anna Thibaud (1861–1948).

Population

See also
Communes of the Jura department

References

Communes of Jura (department)